Giulio Scarpati (born 20 February 1956) is an Italian actor.

Life and career 
Born in Rome, pretty active on stage, after several small film roles Scarpati had his breakout role in 1991 as Marco, the main character in the Giuseppe Piccioni's drama film Chiedi la luna.  In 1994 he won a  David di Donatello for best actor for his performance in Alessandro Di Robilant's Law of Courage.  Scarpati later obtained a large popularity with the role of Lele Martini in the Rai Uno television series Un medico in famiglia.

Scarpati is married to the stage director Nora Venturini and has a son, Edoardo (27-05-1988), and a daughter, Lucia (27-11-1994). He also writes the sports column "Tribuna d’onore" for the newspaper La Repubblica.

Selected filmography 
 Ask for the Moon (1990)
 The Raffle (1991)
 Who Wants to Kill Sara? (1992)
 Gangsters (1992)
 Mario, Maria and Mario (1993) 
 Law of Courage (1994)
 Who Killed Pasolini? (1995)
 Penniless Hearts (1996)
 Bits and Pieces (1996)
 Resurrection (2001)
 A luci spente (2004)
 Magical Nights (2018)

References

External links 

1956 births
Male actors from Rome
Italian male stage actors
Italian male film actors
Italian male television actors
Living people
David di Donatello winners
20th-century Italian male actors
21st-century Italian male actors